Polemius is a genus of soldier beetles in the family Cantharidae. There are about 16 described species in Polemius.

Species
These 16 species belong to the genus Polemius:

 Polemius arizonensis Schaeffer, 1908
 Polemius binotatus Fall, 1907
 Polemius canadensis Brown, 1940
 Polemius crassicornis Wickham, 1914
 Polemius hispaniolae Leng & Mutchler
 Polemius languidus Horn, 1894
 Polemius laticornis (Say, 1825)
 Polemius limbatus LeConte, 1851
 Polemius niger Schaeffer, 1908
 Polemius princeps LeConte, 1885
 Polemius regularis Fall, 1907
 Polemius repandus LeConte, 1866
 Polemius strenuus LeConte, 1885
 Polemius suturalis Blatchley, 1928
 Polemius telephoroides (Schaeffer, 1909)
 Polemius unisulcatus Wittmer

References

Further reading

External links

 

Cantharidae
Articles created by Qbugbot